G.165 is an ITU-T standard for echo cancellers. It is primarily used in telephony. Echo can occur on telephone lines when a user's voice is reflected back to them from further down the line.  This can be distracting for the user and even make conversation unintelligible.  Echo can also interfere with data transmission.  The standard was released for usage in 1993, it was superseded by the G.168.

References

Further reading
 Scott Keagy, Integrating Voice and Data Networks, p. 445, Cisco Press, 2000 .
  K. Murano, S. Unagami, F. Amano, "Echo cancellation and applications", IEEE Communications Magazine, vol. 28, iss. 1, pp. 49–55, January 1990.

ITU-T G Series Recommendations
ITU-T recommendations
Telecommunications-related introductions in 1993